Hastings Elwin  (1776 – 31 August 1852) was an English-born Australian politician.

He was the son of Hastings Elwin and Elizabeth Diana Woolhead. A minor aristocrat, he was lord of the manor of Booton in Norfolk, and his friends included the Marquess of Lansdowne and the poet Thomas Moore. He was a founding member of the Bath Royal Literary and Scientific Institution and a member of the Anacreontic Society. He was a barrister, and spent time in Antigua as advocate general. In 1803 he married Margaret Matilda Ottley; she died in 1826 and he remarried Mary Anne Cole in 1829. Having moved to New South Wales, he was a member of the New South Wales Legislative Council from 1843 to 1844, during which time he was also Chairman of Committees. Elwin died at Camperdown in 1852.

References

1776 births
1852 deaths
Members of the New South Wales Legislative Council
Australian King's Counsel